Corey Stewart may refer to:

Corey Stewart (politician) (born 1968), American politician
Corey Stewart (rugby league), Australian rugby league player active 1990–1993

See also
Corey Stuart, a fictional character from Lassie